The Mayor of Chișinău, officially the General Mayor of the Municipality of Chișinău, is the head of the executive branch of Chișinău's government and a member of the city's Municipal Council.

History 

The first mayor of Chișinău was Anghel Nour in 1817. In 1941, the office was abolished. After the end of the Soviet era and the re-establishment of the office in 1990, Nicolae Costin became the first democratically elected mayor.

List of mayors 
Throughout the passing of time, the mayors of the city of Chișinău have been the following ones:

Russian Empire

Moldavian Democratic Republic

Kingdom of Romania

Moldavian SSR 
Chairmen of the Chișinău City Executive Committee.

Republic of Moldova

See also
 Timeline of Chișinău

 
Chisinau